The UAP European Under-25 Championship was a professional golf tournament for under-25 golfers which was played annually in France from 1988 to 1994, except in 1993. It was played at Golf du Prieuré, a course north-west of Paris.

It was an event on European Tour but prize money did not count towards the Order of Merit/Official Money List and a victory did not count as an official tour win; later such tournaments were designated as "approved special events". A similar event, the Cacharel World Under-25 Championship, was played in France for a number of years until 1983.

Winners

(a) – Amateur

References

Defunct golf tournaments in France